William Whitehead or Bill Whitehead may refer to:

 William Whitehead (poet) (1715–1785), English poet and playwright; Poet Laureate in 1757
 William Adee Whitehead (1810–1884), historian who assisted in the development of Key West, Florida
 William Whitehead (Canadian writer) (1931–2018), Canadian writer, actor and filmmaker
 William Whitehead (organist) (born 1970), English concert organist
 Willie Whitehead (born 1973), American football player
 Bill Whitehead, editor-in-chief at E. P. Dutton, namesake of the Bill Whitehead Award
 Bill Whitehead, New Zealand rugby league administrator
Dr. William Riddick Whitehead, battlefield surgeon and prominent early figure in Denver's medical community, owner of Peabody-Whitehead Mansion